Ligné is a commune in the Loire-Atlantique department in western France.

Location

The commune of Ligné is located 25 km nord-east of Nantes, 17 km north-west of Ancenis and 10 km east of Nort-sur-Erdre. The bordering communes are Les Touches, Mouzeil, Couffé, Le Cellier, Saint-Mars-du-Désert and Petit-Mars.

Before 2015, Ligné was the capital of a canton that also included Couffé, Mouzeil and Le Cellier. The canton was split in 2015 and the commune joined the canton of Nort-sur-Erdre.

Etymology
The name of the locality was attested in the Latin form Lingiacum in 11231, Ligiacum in 1128 and Ligneium in 1277.
In Breton, she was called Polinieg by the Office of the Breton Language, name without historical value.

History
Ligné extends over a height commonly referred to as "Ligné Plateau". This plateau forms the watershed between the Erdre and the Loire.

In the heart of the village, the chapel Saint-Mathurin (XIIIth Century) was the place of a great pilgrimage. After several damages throughout years, the chaptel has been renovated and transformed into a small exhibition center in 2012.

Governance, culture, and education

List of successive mayors

Population

Twinning
Lignée is twinned with Presteigne, Wales since 2004. Cultural exchanges and trips are regularly organized 
between the two cities.

Culture 

Ligné has a few cultural centers.
"Le Préambule" is a multipurpose room opened since 2003 that is reconfigurable to host different types of events. Cultural programming is offered every year from September to May. Both rooms are also used to teach artistic practices. The Saint-Mathurin chaptel is since 2012 a small exhibition center dedicated to visual arts. The city also has a municipal library, as well as two sports complexes.

Education

With a young and growing population, Ligné offers a broad educational offer to its inhabitants. The city has two schools, one public and the other private and two high schools that follow the same principle.
Private schools are Notre-Dame primary school and Saint-Joseph High School, while public schools are Jules Verne primary school and Agnès Varda High School.
Agnès Varda College was inaugurated in 2011 and named in honor of the director of the same name. It welcomes more than 750 students.

See also
Communes of the Loire-Atlantique department

References

Communes of Loire-Atlantique